Firaxis Games is an American video game developer based in Sparks, Maryland. It was founded in May 1996 by Sid Meier, Jeff Briggs and Brian Reynolds as Firaxis Software, following their departure from MicroProse, which Meier had co-founded. The company was renamed to Firaxis Games in July 1997 prior to releasing any titles. It produced seven games primarily for Microsoft Windows personal computers over the next nine years through multiple publishers; these games include wargames such as their first title, Sid Meier's Gettysburg! (1997), and 4X turn-based strategy games, all with the prefix "Sid Meier's" in their official titles. Three of the games were part of the company's flagship Civilization series of 4X games, which was originally begun by Meier at MicroProse. In November 2004, Take-Two Interactive purchased the publishing rights to the series from then-rights holder Infogrames, and a year later in November 2005, after the release of Civilization IV, acquired Firaxis. It became part of the publisher's 2K Games label, and has published exclusively through them since.

Since 2005, Firaxis has released nine further titles related to the Civilization series, primarily 4X games. The other six releases include two titles in the X-COM series of turn-based tactics games, a railroad business simulation game, two mobile tactics games, and a mobile real-time strategy game. Meier is the only founder remaining at the company, where he is the creative director. Firaxis' most recent title is XCOM: Chimera Squad (2020). Firaxis Games has worked on 23 games since 1996, 12 of which are part of the Civilization series.

Games

References

External links 
 

Firaxis Games